Sujatha Nagar is a neighborhood situated on the  Visakhapatnam City, India. The area, which falls under the local administrative limits of Greater Visakhapatnam Municipal Corporation, is about 2.3 km from the Pendurthi..Sujatha Nagar is a well residential colony its well connected with NAD X Road  and Maddilapalem

Transport
APSRTC routes

References

Neighbourhoods in Visakhapatnam